Apocalipsur  is a 2005 Colombian drama film written and directed by Javier Mejía Osorio. It won the National Film Announcement of the Colombian Ministry of Culture in 2002. The film was chosen as the best film at the Cartagena Film Festival in 2007.

Plot
Apocalipsur tells the story of a group of friends in 1991 Medellín, when Medellín was dominated by Pablo Escobar's Medellín Cartel and its rival los Pepes.

One of the friends, el Flaco, leaves his home in Medellín for (suiza) because of threats against his mother. Before leaving, He cuts his hair to be bald and goes to a bar where his friends Carlos 'Caliche', Comadreja y Felipe 'Pipe', a cripple boy, and his girlfriend Maria Adelaida 'Malala' give him a great farewell with a rock band included.

After a few months he comes back to Medellín, but the city is the same war zone he had left behind. Caliche and Malala are dating although Malala loves yet El Flaco. Caliche, after waking up and looking after 'Marihuana', the pet iguana of El Flaco steals money from his mother's boyfriend shortly before going to his van to pick up his friend at the airport. El Flaco’s best friends pick him up at the airport in their "Bola de Nieve," a Volkswagen van in which they have travelled many kilometers together and has become everyone’s refuge. But before leaving, Malala berates Caliche not tell they were going to pick up El Flaco, since the night before being drunk she was not going, and going in the van but chairs passengers and not the co- pilot. Soon pick up Pipe and 'Comadreja', he suffered diarrhea so he had flatulences. The plane whose travel El Flaco pass by Jamaica, Caracas, Bogota for what would 17 hours. When they arrive at a traffic light observed at 4 policemen knowing they could be bought by drug trafficking. Caliche shares their friends the remains of cocaine on a ballot owned by his mother and her boyfriend.

Caliche remembers when he met El Flaco; being kidnapped by gunmen and where is locked in a laundry room, turned into a cage, where he meets El Flaco and befriends. That same night after taking the dishes and their droppings, El Flaco asks his two captors sicarios that allow them to walk him and Caliche. Hitmen after discussing between them allow both young go for a walk in addition to express his desire to kill them. The next day El Flaco tells Caliche is kidnapped being the son of a judge investigating the case of a gunman working for drug traffickers and after receiving multiple death threats, was later kidnapped reciting a poem by Porfirio Barba Jacob. Caliche for his part was kidnapped by former partners of his father who had refused to give them money for their war against the authorities, and Caliche knows her father has called for several gunmen to rescue him. These assassins arrive that night to where El Flaco and Caliche are kidnapped. The two assassins decide to kill El Flaco and let live Caliche who insists the life of his friend but he was locked gunmen and two shots are heard, Caliche believes they killed El Flaco but Caliche when released by the gunmen at the service of his father notes that El Flaco was alive and that the dead had been his two captors so Caliche accompanied by El Flaco and assassins leave the place.

During the trip, Malala tells his friends when his grandmother had known El Flaco and the group of friends stop near a bridge where Malala is temporarily away urinating and three fun. Pipe recalls that even being crippled masturbates with an inflatable sex doll drawing his pain by a bride who betrayed him and at that time El Flaco accompanies him in his grief. By following the trip, the group of friends watch several helicopters are apparently Block search, looking for Escobar. Therefore, the friends end up discussing business by Caliche's dad, Malala concluding that the war against drug trafficking in Colombia is because the United States prohibits the cocaine exported by the Colombian mafia. The gang of friends passing through a checkpoint where police gives young pamphlets for the capture of Escobar.

'Comadreja' tells his friends that 'The Papito' Jibaro (Colombian trafficker) in the neighborhood had been arrested and then released and remember that a year ago he and El Flaco ride bicycle through the streets home of El Papito and buys 'bareta' (marijuana). After selling it plus an additional cannabis, El Papito warns hide drugs by constant police checkpoints. Both friends travel by bicycle where smoking marijuana then retains police captain whose forces them to smoke marijuana tucked in the back of the patrol car and then not tolerate a joke El Flaco, and the cops confiscate the bicycle of both. El Flaco and Comadreja talk while smoking marijuana and being drugged start laughing, and the police captain wants rebuke them in the same way his father rebuked him for smoking cigarettes. The captain hear them laugh and going to the back of the patrol where the hits until the patrol stops at the time a thief in the street is killed by another. The police take the pistol shot thief and abandon the Flaco and Comadreja in the street.

The group continues its journey listening favorite song Flaco after they stop on a cafe to rest. Malala remains far from Caliche confessing that by Flaco she is sad; months ago during the farewell party Flaco in the women's bathroom, Malala confesses to her best friend pregnant with her boyfriend thinking in principle ask Flaco not to go and arm themselves a family, but her friend convinces her to abort and swear not to say anything, but Caliche and Flaco being in the men's bathroom listen and Flaco breaks into tears being comforted by Caliche. Caliche and Malala fight over this matter until are soothed. Meanwhile, Comadreja and Pipe being in the cafeteria joke making believe that the storekeeper that Comadreja is a Latin guy who has lived in the United States, to speak in English. Later the gang remembers that night traveling around the city, pick up in the van to a transvestite prostitute named 'Maria Antonieta' (after the queen of France) and Flaco makes him believe she is foreigner and Flaco risks kiss him.

Caliche recalls that the Flaco, according to his mother, was very lonely in London walking barefoot through the snow. During the trip Pipe in his wheelchair adventure travel is towed to the van and the gang arrives at a vacant lot near the Airport José María Córdoba. Caliche recalls that the Flaco, according to his mother, was very lonely in London walking barefoot through the snow. During the trip Pipe in his wheelchair adventure travel is towed to the van and the gang arrives at a vacant lot near the airport. However, when they come down from the van, Comadreja is not properly closed the door and 'Marihuana', the iguana escapes of the van. As he expected, Comadreja remembers having dreamed Flaco being naked in the snow in London. The boys hope the plane while consuming psychoactives. Seeing that the plane arrives at the airport, the gang goes up there to meet his exiled friend, but when you get seek to 'Marihuana' but nobody takes responsibility that the iguana has escaped and Malala assimilates the iguana is gone forever.

The gang arrives at the airport, waiting for the flight whose last stop was Bogotá. After searching collect the corpse of Flaco, who had died (without explaining how and whose death is spoken by his friends for several excerpts from the film) in London. The gang returns to Medellin with the cadaver in a coffin with the philosophical experience of friendship between 5 and whose youth was already finished. But in the return, apparently Caliche steamrolled the iguana with the van and brakes abruptly causing the coffin with the corpse of Flaco fell into a creek nearby. Flaco's last wish was that wanted to die and reincarnate in the iguana well be close to friends. The cadaver is lost in the stream. At the end a dedication of the director appears:

"For Flaco, Carlos Bernal, who disappeared in Geneva (Switzerland) on 23 October of 1991" (Spanish: "Para el Flaco, Carlos Bernal, desaparecido en Ginebra (Suiza) el 23 de octubre de 1991").

Cast 
 Andrés Echavarría Molletti....El Flaco
 Maricela Gómez....Malala
 Pedro Pabo Ochoa....Caliche
 Ramón Marulanda....Comadreja
 Camilo Díaz....Pipe
 Hernando Casanova ''el culebro....El Papito
 Sergio Valencia....The storekeeper

Awards
Cartagena Film Festival
 Best Colombian Film 2007
 Special Jury Prize: Javier Mejía Osorio

References

External links
 
 

2005 films
2000s Spanish-language films
2005 drama films
Colombian drama films